Charles Beale may refer to:

 Charles Gabriel Beale (1843–1912), Lord Mayor of Birmingham
 Charles Lewis Beale (1824–1899), U.S. congressman